Colm & Jim-Jim are an Irish radio duo.

Radio personalities
 Colm Hayes, (born Colm Caffrey) an Irish radio and television personality
Jim-Jim Nugent, an Irish radio and television personality

Radio shows
 The Colm & Jim-Jim Breakfast Show, a 2fm radio show presented by Hayes and Nugent
 The Strawberry Alarm Clock, an FM104 radio show that launched the Hayes and Nugent professional partnership

TV shows
 Colm and Jim-Jim's Home Run, an RTÉ One game show presented by Hayes and Nugent

References 

FM104 presenters
Radio sidekicks
RTÉ 2fm presenters
RTÉ television presenters
Television sidekicks